Twas the Night Before Christmas is a 1974 animated Christmas television special produced by Rankin/Bass Productions and based on the famous 1823 poem that opens with this line. The special first originally aired on CBS on December 8, 1974 where it aired annually until 1994, when The Family Channel (now Freeform) took over its syndication rights. AMC took over syndication rights for the special in 2018.

Although the opening credits mention "told and sung by Joel Grey", it is really narrated by George Gobel, as there is more emphasis on the point of view of Father Mouse, with Moore's poem read by Grey as a secondary plot.

Plot
The program is set in the fictional town of Junctionville, New York around the turn of the 20th century. Santa Claus is offended by an anonymous letter printed in the town's newspaper (and signed "all of us") claiming that he doesn't exist. In response, Santa returns the entire town's letters to them unopened. Upon reading the anonymous letter printed in the newspaper, Father Mouse — a mouse assistant to the human clockmaker Joshua Trundle — immediately suspects that his brainy, college student son Albert is its author. Albert confirms his suspicions, repeating the letter verbatim to him.

Father Mouse and the Trundle Family devise a plan to appease Santa by building a singing clock tower for him, built with a special recording to play a song to coax him not to bypass Junctionville on Christmas Eve.  Unfortunately, Albert enters the clock to explore it without permission, and inadvertently causes it to malfunction in front of the whole town, seriously damaging Trundle's professional reputation. Furthermore, the Mayor, publicly embarrassed at the clock tower's failure, refuses to give Joshua access to it for repairs.

Confessing his mistake, Albert volunteers to repair it himself and Father Mouse tells Joshua of the situation before waiting at his bed with worry on Christmas Eve. Although Albert does not complete his task until about one minute after the midnight deadline, the clock does play its song within earshot of Santa which convinces him to turn around and come to town after all.

Cast
 George Gobel as Father Mouse (primary narrator)
 Joel Grey as Joshua Trundle (secondary narrator)
 Tammy Grimes as Albert
 John McGiver as the Mayor of Junctionville

Additional voices
 Robert McFadden as Substation Operator, Councilmen, Handyman
 Allen Swift as Santa Claus
 Pat Bright as Sarah Trundle/Mother Mouse
 Christine Winter as Girl/Girl Mouse
 Scott Firestone as Boy/Boy Mouse
 The Wee Winter Singers as the Chorus

Crew
 Written by Jerome Coopersmith, Larz Bourne
 Based on the Poem by Clement Moore
 Music: Maury Laws
 Lyrics: Jules Bass
 Produced and Directed by Arthur Rankin Jr. and Jules Bass
 Associate Producer: Mary Alice Dwyer-Dobbin
 Editorial Supervision: Irwin Goldress, Vincent Juliano
 Design: Paul Coker Jr.
 Sound Engineers: Don Hahn, Tom Brennand, John Curcio
 Sound Effects: Tom Clack
 Animation Production - Topcraft, Japan
 Storyboard Artist: Takashi Hisaoka
 Animation Direction: Tokiji Kaburaki, Kazuyuki Kobayashi, Hidemi Kubo
 Key Animation: Katsumi Aoshima, Hiroshi Oikawa
 Animation: Toru Hara, Tsuguyuki Kubo
 Layout Artist: Yoshinori Kanemori
 Background Designs: Minoru Nishida
 Background Artist: Kazusuke Yoshihara
 Technical Direction: Kôichi Sasaki, Katsuhisa Yamada
 Musical Director: Maury Laws

Songs
There are three musical numbers in the program:

"Give Your Heart a Try" - Father Mouse (George Gobel)
"Even a Miracle Needs a Hand" - Joshua Trundle (Joel Grey), Albert (Tammy Grimes)
"Christmas Chimes are Calling (Santa, Santa)" - Chorus

In popular culture 
"Even a Miracle Needs a Hand" later appeared on South Park in the Season 4 episode "A Very Crappy Christmas". Similar to its use in the original special, the song is sung by Kyle to Stan and Kenny during a seemingly hopeless situation. At one point, Joshua Trundle's face is even superimposed over Kyle's face.

Production
Like many of Rankin/Bass' other animated TV specials, this special was animated in Japan by the animation studio Topcraft, which was rolled into Studio Ghibli in 1985.

Home media
The special was originally first issued on VHS by ABC Video Enterprises and Golden Book Video in 1987. After Lorimar was purchased by Time Warner, Warner Home Video/Warner Bros. Family Entertainment (owners of the post-1974 Rankin/Bass library), re-released the special on VHS in 1990, and on DVD in 2004, paired with the 1976 special Frosty's Winter Wonderland. A Blu-ray was released on October 5, 2011. It is also available on iTunes for purchase.

See also
 List of Christmas films

References

External links

Excerpt

1974 in American television
1974 television specials
1970s American animated films
1970s American television specials
1970s animated television specials
CBS television specials
Christmas television specials
Films scored by Maury Laws
Television shows directed by Jules Bass
Television shows directed by Arthur Rankin Jr.
Santa Claus in television
Television shows based on poems
Topcraft
Works based on A Visit from St. Nicholas
Rankin/Bass Productions television specials
Animated Christmas television specials